Simeiz is a resort town, an urban-type settlement in Yalta Municipality in the Autonomous Republic of Crimea, a territory recognized by a majority of countries as part of Ukraine and incorporated by Russia as the Republic of Crimea. Its name is of Greek origin (σημαία 'flag' + -εις, a plural suffix). Population:

History
There are prehistoric dolmens and fortifications nearby; in the Middle Ages the area was under the control of the Byzantine Empire, which built a fortified monastery in the vicinity (and may have given the town its name). As the Byzantine power weakened, the area fell under the control of Genoa, which in its turn gave way to the Ottoman Empire; under the Ottomans the village was ruled from Mangup. By 1778, with the departure of the Christian population, the village was depopulated.

In 1828 Simeiz came into the ownership of Ivan Akimovich Maltsov, who planted grapevines and fruit orchards; at the start of the 20th century his descendants created a resort, Novy Simoiz, which quickly became one of the most prestigious resorts in the Crimea. This period saw the construction of a park and a number of villas which remain to this day. In 1912 Nicholas II visited with his family. After the October Revolution, Simeiz was nationalized and public sanatoriums were created, mainly specializing in tuberculosis. In 1927 Simeiz was visited by around 10,000 people.

During World War II the Germans occupied Simeiz, causing much death and destruction; the town was liberated by the Red Army on April 16, 1944. On May 18 of that year the local Crimean Tatars were exiled to Central Asia. After the war, the resort experienced a rebirth, and the ruins were gone by 1955. Since the end of the Soviet Union, however, it has seriously deteriorated.

Demographics
The population has risen from 622 in 1926 (431 Crimean Tatars, 119 Russians, 31 Greeks, 25 Ukrainians) to 3,501 in 2001.

Famous residents
 Dmitry Milyutin

Gallery

Climate

See also
 Simeiz Observatory

References

External links
 
 Simeiz.net
 Pictures of Simeiz
 Simeiz - Climbing/Topo (PL)

Urban-type settlements in Crimea
Seaside resorts in Ukraine
Seaside resorts in Russia
Yalta Municipality